Home Hardware Stores Ltd. is a privately held Canadian home improvement, construction materials, and furniture retailer. Co-founded in 1964 by Walter Hachborn and headquartered in St. Jacobs, Ontario, the chain is co-operatively owned by over 1,100 independently owned member stores, including one of them located in the French territory of Saint Pierre and Miquelon.

Store brands
Home Hardware store brands are well known in Canada and include:
 Beauti-Tone (paint)
 Benchmark (tools)
 Builders Hardware (hinges, latches, etc.)
 HomePack (screws, nails etc.)
 Home Plumber 
 Home Essentials
 Home Handyman
 Home Gardener
 HomeWorks Home Remodeling Software
 Home-Bond (glues)
 HomeWares (kitchenwares)
 Kuraidori (kitchen accessories)
 Natura (green products)
 Classic (lighting fixtures)
 Radley (power tools)
 OmniMax (electrical devices)
 River Trail (camping supplies)
 Screeneze (screened porch solution with no splines)
 Unival (automotive)
 Weathershield (caulking, weatherstripping and expanding foam)
 Wood-Shield (stain purposes)

Recent history
In 1981 the eastern-Canada-based Home Hardware merged with western-Canada-based Link Hardware to create a national chain.

Home Hardware has survived the expansion of The Home Depot into Canada, beginning in 1994, as well as the expansion of a domestic competitor, Rona, Inc., into the big-box arena.

In 2000, the chain expanded through the purchase of the Beaver Lumber chain from Molson Brewery.

On January 11, 2003, Home Hardware received unexpected worldwide exposure when a T-shirt worn by Avril Lavigne during a performance on Saturday Night Live featured her hometown of Greater Napanee, Ontario and the local hardware store there. In response, the chain produced a limited-edition line of identical T-shirts for sale at locations nationwide, with proceeds going to charity.

In 2004, Canada Post issued a postage stamp to commemorate the company's 40th anniversary. 
 The stamp was designed by Home Hardware's creative director, Ron Mugford.

References

External links

 

Hardware stores of Canada
Cooperatives in Canada
Retailers' cooperatives
Retail companies established in 1964
Woolwich, Ontario
Canadian brands
Companies based in the Regional Municipality of Waterloo
1964 establishments in Ontario